The Netherlands Carillon is a 127-foot (39-m) tall campanile housing a 53-bell carillon located in Arlington County, Virginia. The instrument and tower were given in the 1950s "From the People of the Netherlands to the People of the United States of America" to thank the United States for its contributions to the liberation of the Netherlands from Nazi Germany in 1945 and for its economic aid in the years after. The Netherlands Carillon is a historic property listed on the National Register of Historic Places as part of Arlington Ridge Park, which is part of the George Washington Memorial Parkway. It is owned and operated by the National Park Service. The carillon is situated on a ridge overlooking the Potomac River and Washington, DC, and it provides expansive views of the National Mall, West Potomac Park (its original, temporary location), and Arlington National Cemetery. Its adjacency to the Marine Corps War Memorial to the north and Arlington National Cemetery to the south draws 1.2 million visitors annually, including recreational visitors from Rosslyn's residential areas. Throughout the day, the carillon automatically plays the Westminster Quarters. On significant days of the year in Dutch and American culture, it plays automated concerts, and from June to August, the director-carillonist Edward Nassor hosts a concert series whereby visiting carillonists perform weekly concerts on the instrument.

History
In late 1951, Govert L. Verheul, press officer of the Dutch Ministry of Economic Affairs in The Hague, proposed that the Netherlands present a gift to the United States to commemorate their actions during and after World War II and as a symbol of the two countries' lasting friendship. He came up with the idea of gifting a carillon when washing dishes one night and accidentally clinking wine glasses together. Consequently, a large-scale fundraising campaign was launched, and it received an enthusiastic response. It was eventually endorsed by Queen Juliana. On April 4, 1952, she visited the United States to present a small silver bell to President Harry S. Truman as a token of the carillon that was to come. In ceremonies at Meridian Hill Park in Washington, DC, the queen spoke of the importance of the small bells of the future instrument:

Two years later, forty-nine bells arrived and were installed in West Potomac Park, where they were formally accepted by the United States. The Netherlands did not initially have the money to provide a proper campanile for the carillon, so it was housed in a temporary structure. Gerrit Rietveld, a Dutch furniture designer and architect, was approached to design the campanile, but he was eventually removed from the project because of his perceived communist sympathies. Instead, renowned Dutch architect Joost W. C. Boks designed the carillon's permanent home. The tower was erected just north of Arlington National Cemetery and south of the Marine Corps War Memorial and was completed by early 1960. The carillon and new tower received a formal dedication ceremony on May 5, 1960, or the fifteenth anniversary of Dutch Liberation Day. The inaugural concert was performed by renowned carillonist Charles T. Chapman.

A tulip library was planted in a circular bed immediately to the east of the plaza in 1964, also a gift from the Netherlands. A small successional woodland to the southwest forms the backdrop to the carillon as a result of the 1960s National Capital Parks Planting Plan. Additional landscaped beds in the form of musical notes were planted in 1967 and 1972 as part of Lady Bird Johnson’s Beautification Program, with a variety of annuals and perennials, in addition to tulips. The program also planted the horseshoe of trees for the campanile's backdrop.

After its dedication in 1960, the carillon was seldom played. It only performed for Easter Sunday services sponsored by the Arlington Ministerial Association. The few performances were by Frank Péchin Law. He assumed the position of director-carillonist after his instrumental involvement in establishing the "Summer Series of Recitals on the Netherlands Carillon" in July 1963, sponsored by the US Department of the Interior. Every Saturday from July through August, the carillon is played by a guest carillonist, invited by the director-carillonist. In the early 1970s, the Netherlands Carillon was repainted from a dark bronze to a gray blue color. In 1983, less than twenty-five years after the carillon's construction and after years of pressure from Mr. Law, a major renovation was undertaken to address deterioration of the tower's steel panels. The National Park Service announced a $300,000 renovation plan for the instrument in 1981, but budget issues delayed the project. Again, the tower was repainted the light gray blue color, neither time with the approval of the Commission of Fine Arts. Upon Mr. Law's death in 1985, the Netherlands Carillon fell silent until Edward M. Nassor took over the position of director-carillonist in 1987.

In the years before the fiftieth anniversary of Dutch Liberation Day in 1995, a group of prominent Dutch businessmen established a foundation to assist in the refurbishment of the carillon and tower, which had not seen major care since 1970. They were motivated by the significance of the meaning behind the Netherlands Carillon to lead this effort. By teaming up with the Netherlands Chamber of Commerce in the United States, the Netherland-America Foundation, and the government of the Netherlands, approximately $1,400,000 was raised for the project to move forward. The tower was closed for modernization changes, and the original dark bronze color of the tower was restored. The bells were transported to the Netherlands to be repaired by Royal Eijsbouts, except for the largest thirteen, which remained in the tower and were repaired in place. The original playing keyboard was replaced. Royal Eijsbouts also cast a fiftieth bell in celebration of the fiftieth anniversary of Dutch liberation. It was presented by Dutch Prime Minister Wim Kok to U.S. President Bill Clinton on February 28, 1995, and the renovated carillon was dedicated on May 5, 1995. After receiving the new bell, President Clinton commented on its significance:

The Netherlands Carillon found itself in bad shape again less than twenty years later. Due to severe rusting and fears of structural instability, the tower was closed to the public in the early 2010s. In 2016, the National Park Service and Royal Netherlands Embassy launched a campaign to fundraise money for a $5,800,000 restoration of the carillon. The Park Service committed $4 million. In October 2019, the third renovation of the carillon was officially launched. The National Park Service was tasked with work on the tower, while the Royal Netherlands Embassy was tasked with work on the carillon. The carillon was transported to the Royal Eijsbouts foundry and arrived on December 3, 2019. In celebration of the Dutch "75 Years of Freedom" campaign, the carillon received three new bells with each dedicated to an American who had a significant impact on Dutch and American society: General George C. Marshall, Martin Luther King Jr., and Eleanor Roosevelt. The addition of these three bells converted the carillon to a concert pitch instrument and upgraded it to "grand carillon" status. The tower required extensive restorative work to the steel plates and inner structure of the tower. Additional supports were installed to account for the added weight of the three new bells.

The first carillon at the Arlington National Cemetery was installed by Amvets in 1949 and dedicated by President Truman.

Design and symbolism

Carillon
In the early 1950s, there were three major Dutch bell founders: Van Bergen, Royal Eijsbouts and Petit & Fritsen. In order to avoid showing favoritism, all three founders were asked to cast the original forty-nine bells jointly and anonymously between 1952 and 1953. The bells are constructed of a bronze alloy of approximately four-fifths copper and one-fifth tin. Each bell carries an emblem signifying a group within Dutch society. The verses cast on the bells were composed by the Dutch poet, Ben van Eysselsteijn.

A fiftieth bell, cast by Royal Eijsbouts, was added following Dutch- and American-sponsored renovations in 1995, and dedicated on May 5, the fiftieth anniversary of the liberation of the Netherlands. It is two semitones higher in pitch than the lightest of the original forty-nine bells. The years "1945" and "1995" and the words "freedom" and "friendship" are inscribed on this bell.

The 2019–21 renovation increased the size of the carillon to fifty-three bells, all cast by Royal Eijsbouts, and converted the instrument to concert pitch. These three additional bells are dedicated jointly to "75 Years of Freedom" and individually to people who had a major impact on the Netherlands and the United States during and after World War II: 1) General George C. Marshall for his role in the Marshall Plan, from which the Netherlands received over $1 billion for post-war reconstruction efforts; 2) the Rev. Dr. Martin Luther King Jr., for his role as the voice of the American civil rights movement; and 3) Eleanor Roosevelt, for her role as an advocate for social justice and human rights.

Tower
The tower is an open steel structure reinforced by steel plates and a bronze baked-enamel finish. It was designed by renowned Dutch architect Joost W. C. Boks (1904–1986) and constructed in 1960. The playing cabin sits in the center of the upper observation deck. At the base of the tower, a large inscription reads "From the People of the Netherlands to the People of the United States of America." The interconnecting lines and rectangles of the structure's frame echo the work of Dutch abstract painter Piet Mondrian. The tower's design also reflects the rejection of classical European architecture, which, in the years immediately following World War II, was associated with fascist regimes. The Netherlands Carillon is the first modernist steel memorial associated with the otherwise classical stone architecture found on the National Mall.

Grounds

The Netherlands Carillon stands on a  quartzite plaza and is enclosed by a low lava stone wall. Two bronze lions, which represent the Dutch Royal Family, guard the entrance to the plaza. They were designed by Dutch sculptor Paul Philip Koning. The Netherlands Carillon is located just north of Arlington National Cemetery and south of the Marine Corps War Memorial. It is administered by the National Park Service as part of the George Washington Memorial Parkway complex in Arlington Ridge Park.

A tulip library was planted in a circular bed immediately to the east of the plaza in 1964. As they are culturally and economically significant to the Netherlands, ten thousand tulips are planted in these gardens each year. In 1967 and 1972, First Lady Lady Bird Johnson's Beautification Program embellished the carillon grounds with new flower gardens in the shape of musical notes. These gardens are planted with tulips and other perennials and annuals. The program also planted the horseshoe of trees surrounding the backdrop of the campanile.

Concerts
The Netherlands Carillon keeps time throughout the day by playing the Westminster Quarters on the hours and quarters. The carillon plays several automated concerts each day and on significant days in Dutch and American culture:

 Mondays through Saturdays at noon and 6:00 PM
 Medley of armed forces anthems
 Stars and Stripes Forever
 Sundays at noon
 Star-Spangled Banner
 Wilhelmus (the Dutch national anthem)
 Stars and Stripes Forever
 Sundays at 6:00 PM
 Star-Spangled Banner
 America the Beautiful
 Eternal Father, Strong To Save (the Navy Hymn)
 May 5 (Dutch Liberation Day) at noon and 6:00 PM
 Star-Spangled Banner
 Wilhelmus (the Dutch national anthem)
 September 2 at 9:04 AM (The time at which the Japanese Instrument of Surrender was signed aboard the USS Missouri in 1945.)
 Star-Spangled Banner
 America the Beautiful
 Eternal Father, Strong To Save
 Thanksgiving Day at noon and 6:00 PM
 Simple Gifts
 We Gather Together
 December 31 at 6:00 PM
 Auld Lang Syne

During the months of June, July, and August, director-carillonist Edward Nassor organizes weekly concerts and recitals on Saturday afternoons. Carillonists from across the world are invited to play various styles of music each week. A schedule of concerts and visiting carillonists is published on the National Park Service's website in the months before the season begins.

See also
 Netherlands–United States relations
 Other war memorial carillons
 National War Memorial (New Zealand)
 Netherlands Centennial Carillon
 List of carillons in the United States

References

External links

 National Park Service official site
 President Truman's full remarks on accepting the Netherlands Carillon, April 4, 1952
 Correspondence between President Eisenhower and Queen Juliana upon the finished campanile, May 5, 1960
 Flickr album of the 2019–21 renovation of the Netherlands Carillon
 Flickr album of the 2016 Dutch Remembrance Day ceremonies at the Netherlands Carillon

1960 establishments in Virginia
1960 sculptures
Buildings and structures in Arlington County, Virginia
Carillons
Diplomatic gifts
George Washington Memorial Parkway
Monuments and memorials in Virginia
Netherlands–United States relations
Tourist attractions in Arlington County, Virginia
Towers completed in 1960
World War II memorials in the United States